The Laborec is a river in eastern Slovakia that flows through the districts of Medzilaborce, Humenné, and Michalovce in the Košice Region, and the Prešov Region. The river drains the Laborec Highlands.

Tributaries
Tributaries of the Laborec river include the Uzh which joins the Laborec near the city of Drahňov in Michalovce District, and the Cirocha river. The Laborec itself is a tributary, flowing into the Latorica river.

Gallery

References

External links

Rivers of Slovakia
Geography of Košice Region
Geography of Prešov Region